The Bergstraße-Odenwald Nature Park is a nature park in southern Germany with an area of 3,500 km² that lies between the rivers Rhine, Main (river) and Neckar. In the south it overlaps in places with the Neckar Valley-Odenwald Nature Park on the territory of Baden-Württemberg. In the east it meets the Bavarian Spessart Nature Park at the River Main. The nature park covers parts of the states of Baden-Württemberg, Bavaria and Hesse.

Sights 
 Messel Pit,
 Lorsch Abbey,
 Kühkopf-Knoblochsaue, Stockstadt am Rhein
 Odenwald Limes
 Felsenmeer near Reichenbach, Lautertal (Odenwald)
 Obrunn Gorge between Höchst im Odenwald and Rimhorn
 Heidelberg and Heidelberg Castle
 Lösswand von Haarlass in Heidelberg, the first scientific description of which by Karl Cäsar von Leonhard in 1824 led to the introduction of the term loess
 Katzenbuckel – at 626 metres, the highest point in the Odenwald
 Odenwald Open Air Museum in Walldürn-Gottersdorf
 Eberstadt Stalactite Cave near Buchen (Odenwald)
 Bergstraße Nature Conservation Centre near Bensheim
 Marie in der Kohlbach Pit, a visitor mine, near Hohensachsen
 Anna Elisabeth Pit, another visitor mine, near Schriesheim

Gallery

See also 
 List of nature parks in Germany

References

External links 

 Official website of the nature park
 Location and extent within Bavaria (OpenStreetMap)

Geoparks in Germany
Nature parks in Baden-Württemberg
Nature parks in Bavaria
Nature parks in Hesse
Odenwald
Franconia